Siv Margaretha Pettersson (3 March 1955 – 12 January 1975) was a Swedish singer, best known for her Christmas song "Låt mig få tända ett ljus (Schlafe, mein Prinzchen, schlaf' ein)".

Petterson was born in Saint Matthew Parish, Stockholm. She had a major 1972–1973 Christmas hit with "Låt mig få tända ett ljus" and a minor 1974 success with Evert Taube's "Så länge skutan kan gå". She died in a road accident in Årjäng, Värmland County, in January 1975, aged 19.

Discography

Albums
Siv Pettersson – 1972
I dur och moll – 1973
Låt mig få tända ett ljus, compilation album (1977)

Singles
Vår egen bit av världen/Vem är du och vem är jag – 1972
Sommar kom, vinter gå/Jag går i tusen tankar – 1973
Qua la linta/Jag fallre för trumpet – 1973
Nu är det din tur/Så länge skutan kan gå – 1974
Jag längtar bara efter att få komma hem/Det måste finnas någon värld – 1974

Svensktoppen songs
Låt mig få tända ett ljus (Schlafe, mein Prinzchen, schlaf' ein) – 1972-1973
Det måste finnas någon värld – 1974
Så länge skutan kan gå – 1974

References 

1955 births
1975 deaths
Schlager musicians
Swedish women guitarists
Swedish women singer-songwriters
Singers from Stockholm
Road incident deaths in Sweden
20th-century Swedish women singers